Caulerpa lanuginosa is a species of seaweed in the Caulerpaceae family.

The species is found in a small area along the coast in the Pilbara region of Western Australia

References

lanuginosa
Species described in 1873